The Apostolic Nunciature to Prussia provided representation on behalf of the Holy See to the Free State of Prussia. It was based in Berlin.

History
Pope Pius XI established the nunciature in 1925 at the request of the Weimar Republic, which intended to give greater prominence to Berlin's Catholics. Such a nunciature had been mooted since the 1871 constitution of the German Empire, but the strong Protestant presence, the support of the kings of Prussia and emperors of Germany, the lack of clear support for such a nunciature from the Holy See and opposition from Austria delayed its inauguration. There were already long standing nunciatures to Germany and Bavaria, usually both held by the same man.

The German states lost their independence on 30 January 1934, and the nunciature in Berlin was closed.

Nuncios
1925–19 August 1929 - Eugenio Pacelli (later Pope Pius XII) 
also apostolic nuncio to Bavaria (1917 to 24 January 1925) and to Germany (1920-1929)
1930–31 May 1934 - Cesare Orsenigo
also apostolic nuncio to Germany (1930-1945)

References

1925 establishments in Germany
1934 disestablishments in Germany